Begonia duncan-thomasii is a species of plant in the family Begoniaceae. It is endemic to Cameroon.  Its natural habitats are subtropical or tropical moist montane forests and rocky areas. It is threatened by habitat loss.

References

Flora of Cameroon
duncan-thomasii
Vulnerable plants
Taxonomy articles created by Polbot